The men's 1000 m race of the 2011 World Single Distance Speed Skating Championships was held on March 11 at 14:00 local time.

Results

References

2011 World Single Distance Speed Skating Championships